The City of Springvale was a local government area about  southeast of Melbourne, the state capital of Victoria, Australia.

History

Springvale was first incorporated as part of the Dandenong Road District on 6 February 1857. It then became part of the Shire of Dandenong on 16 May 1873. In May 1920, its coastal section split away to form the Borough of Carrum. The Shire of Dandenong was subdivided into two separate municipalities, namely the Shire of Dandenong and the Shire of Springvale and Noble Park, which came into effect on 31 May 1955. In May 1959, it lost  of land to the City of Oakleigh. The City of Springvale was proclaimed on 22 April 1961.

On 15 December 1994, the City of Springvale amalgamated with the then City of Dandenong to become known as the City of Greater Dandenong. The suburbs of Dingley Village, Braeside, Aspendale Gardens, Chelsea Heights and Patterson Lakes were transferred to the newly created City of Kingston.

Council meetings were held at the City Hall, at Springvale Road and Grace Park Avenue, Springvale. It presently serves as city offices for the City of Greater Dandenong.

Wards

The City of Springvale was subdivided into four wards in April 1987, each electing three councillors:
 North Ward
 Central Ward
 South Ward
 West Ward

Suburbs
 Aspendale Gardens (now part of the City of Kingston)
 Bangholme (now part of the City of Greater Dandenong)
 Braeside (now part of the City of Kingston)
 Carrum Downs (part only), (now part of the City of Frankston)
 Chelsea Heights (now part of the City of Kingston)
 Dingley Village (now part of the City of Kingston)
 Keysborough (now part of the City of Greater Dandenong)
 Noble Park (now part of the City of Greater Dandenong)
 Noble Park North (now part of the City of Greater Dandenong)
 Patterson Lakes (now part of the City of Kingston)
 Springvale* (now part of the City of Greater Dandenong)
 Springvale South (now part of the City of Greater Dandenong)

* Council seat.

Population

* Estimate in the 1958 Victorian Year Book.

References

External links
 Victorian Places - Springvale

Springvale
1857 establishments in Australia
1994 disestablishments in Australia
City of Greater Dandenong
City of Kingston (Victoria)